Samuel Livermore (c. 1786–1833) was an American lawyer and legal writer, known for his works on agency law and conflict of laws.

Livermore graduated from Phillips Exeter Academy in 1800 and from Harvard in 1804.  He subsequently studied law and was admitted to the bar.  He moved to New Orleans, where he lived until his death.  Livermore authored two treatises on the law, A Treatise on the Law of Principal and Agent, and of Sales by Auction (Boston, 1811; republished in 2 vols., Baltimore, 1818), and Dissertations on the Questions which arise from the Contrariety of the Positive Laws of Different States and Nations (New Orleans, 1828), the latter work on conflict of laws.

Livermore's works continue to be cited in court decisions, most recently by the U.S. Supreme Court in Domino's Pizza, Inc. v. McDonald, 546 U.S. 470 (2006), which cited to Livermore's 1818 edition of Treatise for a principle of agency law.

American legal writers
Louisiana lawyers
Writers from New Orleans
Harvard University alumni
1786 births
1833 deaths
American male non-fiction writers
19th-century American writers
19th-century American lawyers
19th-century American male writers
Conflict of laws scholars
Phillips Exeter Academy alumni